Girochinsha (Guillotine Society) was an early 20th century Japanese anarchist group that unsuccessfully targeted members of the imperial state. Their early 1920s plot to attack the crown prince Hirohito led to the hanging of members Furuta Daijirō and Nakahama Testu.

The group is portrayed in the 2018 film The Chrysanthemum and the Guillotine.

References

Bibliography 

 

Anarchism in Japan
Anarchist organizations in Japan